Niall Donohue (also spelled Donoghue) (25 October 1990 − 23 October 2013) was an Irish hurler who played at senior level for the Galway senior team.

Early life and career
Born in Kilbeacanty, County Galway, Donohue first played competitive hurling while at school in Gort Community School. He arrived on the inter-county scene at the age of seventeen when he first linked up with the Galway minor team, before later joining the under-21 side. He made his senior debut in the 2012 National Hurling League. Donohue played a key part for Galway over the following two seasons, and won one Leinster medal. He was an All-Ireland runner-up on one occasion. He was also nominated for an All Star this year. Throughout his career Donohue made eight championship appearances.

As a member of the Connacht inter-provincial team for two successive years, Donohue unsuccessfully contested two Railway Cup finals. At club level he played with Kilbeacanty.

Death
Donohue was found dead in his home on 23 October 2013, two days before his 23rd birthday. His death brought the topic of suicide into public consciousness. His funeral was attended by a large number of mourners from the GAA community across the country, including his Galway teammates. A number of other figures in the GAA, such as the Kilkenny manager Brian Cody and the association president Liam O'Neill, called to the Donohue family home to pay their respects.

In 2017 following Galway's win at the All-Ireland Hurling final, winning captain David Burke paid tribute to Donohue in his winner's speech stating: "One other person I can't let today pass without mentioning: He was soldiering with us for years, a good friend of mine and first cousin of Conor Whelan, he passed away in 2013. Niall Donohue, we'll never forget him and we'll remember him today."

References

1990 births
2013 suicides
Kilbeacanty hurlers
Galway inter-county hurlers
Connacht inter-provincial hurlers
Suicides in the Republic of Ireland